The Battle of Taragarh was a battle fought between the Sikh forces led by Sahibzada Ajit Singh and the Mughal forces assisted by Rajas of the Sivalik Hills.

Background

The hill chiefs were alarmed by the success of Guru Gobind Singh. In a meeting of the hill kings, they all decided collect high contingents of troops from every raja and attack the Sikhs in Anandpur. They besieged Anandpur. The Sikhs took position in the 5 forts at Anandpur. The Defence of Lohgarh was entrusted to Sher Singh and Nahar Singh, Udai Singh took charge of Fatehgarh and Sahibzada Ajit Singh took command of force defending Taragarh.

Battle

Taragarh was the first fort to be attacked by the hill chiefs. Ajmer Chand made a forceful attack on Taragarh but was pushed back by the determinded resistance of Ajit Singh. Raja Ajmer Chand was overcome by the number of casualties the Rajputs had suffered and was ready to sue for peace. However, Raja Bhup Chand won the argument to keep fighting against the Sikhs. Some Sikh warriors like Bhai Sangat Singh, Bhai Kalyan Singh and Bhai Ishar Singh embraced martyrdom. A hill chieftain Raja Ghumand Chand suffered severe wounds in the battle.

Aftermath

The next day, Ajmer Chand again mounted fierce assault on the fort named Fatehgarh. For 4 days the chiefs attacked the fortresses without success. They decided to isolate the forts and prevented people from entering or exiting them.

See also 
 Nihang
 Martyrdom and Sikhism

References

Battles involving the Sikhs
History of India